The Battle of Wan was the first major battle after the death of Banda Singh Bahadur which occurred in 1726 CE.

Events 
The cause of this was Chaudry Sahib Rai, a government informer kept complaining to the Faujdar of Patti. He kept complaining on how Tara Singh always keeps criminals instead of turning them in. At first, the faujder sent 25 horse cavalry and 80 troops , but one of Wan's colleagues fought bravely and killed the commander and several troops. Ja'far told all about it to Zakariya Khan, who sent a high number of troops including 2200 horsemen, 5 elephants, 40 camel carried guns and 4 artillery guns.

See also
List of battles involving the Sikh Empire

References

Sikhism and violence
Battles involving the Sikhs